Józef Reszpondek (17 March 1951 – 21 April 2002) was a Polish boxer. He competed in the men's bantamweight event at the 1972 Summer Olympics. In his first fight, he lost to Aldo Cosentino of France. At the 1972 Summer Olympics, he lost in his first fight to Aldo Cosentino of France.

References

1951 births
2002 deaths
Polish male boxers
Olympic boxers of Poland
Boxers at the 1972 Summer Olympics
Sportspeople from Łódź
Bantamweight boxers